Vasily Ivanovich Minakov   (7 February 1921 — 8 October 2016) was Soviet naval pilot who was awarded the title Hero of the Soviet Union during World War II. After the conflict he remained in the military, reaching the rank major-general.

As a member of the Komsomol since 1938, he joined the Communist Party 1943.

After graduating from the Military Academy of the General Staff of the Armed Forces of Russia in 1961, he became Chief of Staff   First Deputy Commander of the Air Force of the Northern Fleet.

In the 1960s he spent several years in the United Arab Republic, where he helped organize the Egyptian naval aviation.

In February 1971, Minakov was appointed head of the branch of the 30th Central Scientific Research Institute, Ministry of Defence in Leningrad, where he directed the development of aviation equipment, in particular, 5 types of aircraft and 7 types of helicopters. In 1974 he was awarded the academic degree of candidate of naval sciences; has the academic title of associate professor.

He retired in 1985. He lived in Vyborgsky District, Saint Petersburg. He died on 8 October 2016 and was buried in the Nikolskoe Cemetery.

References

External links
 Лица Победы.   Василий Иванович Минаков
 Авиаторы Второй мировой

1921 births
2016 deaths
People from Mineralnye Vody
Soviet major generals
Heroes of the Soviet Union
Recipients of the Order of Lenin
Recipients of the Order of the Red Banner
Recipients of the Order of Alexander Nevsky
Recipients of the Medal of Zhukov
Soviet World War II pilots
Communist Party of the Soviet Union members
Burials at Nikolskoe Cemetery
N. G. Kuznetsov Naval Academy alumni
Military Academy of the General Staff of the Armed Forces of the Soviet Union alumni